Kelly Colleen Degnan is a career member of the Senior Foreign Service, class of Minister-Counselor, currently serving as the US Ambassador to Georgia. Prior to that she served as the Political Advisor to the Commander of United States Naval Forces Europe / United States Naval Forces Africa. Previously, she was the Deputy Chief of Mission (DCM) to the U.S. Mission to Italy and San Marino in Rome, Italy. In September 2019, she was nominated to be the next U.S. Ambassador to Georgia.

Education 
Degnan graduated from the University of Southern California Law Center and practiced law in California for several years. She sailed the Pacific Ocean for five years, working as legal counsel in the Federated States of Micronesia and the Republic of Palau before joining the State Department. She holds an undergraduate degree in journalism from Northwestern University's Medill School of Journalism.

Career 
Following the departure of Ambassador John R. Phillips,  Degnan became Chargé d'Affaires ad interim (the acting U.S. Ambassador) to the U.S. Mission to Italy and San Marino from January 18, 2017, until October 1, 2017, when Ambassador Lewis Eisenberg arrived. She was the Deputy Chief of Mission (DCM) prior to that point, starting in November 2015, and continued to serve as DCM until July 2019. Prior to the assignment in Rome, she served on the Secretary of State's staff as Deputy Executive Secretary from February 2014 to September 2015. Prior to returning to Washington, Degnan served as Deputy Chief of Mission at U.S. Embassy Pristina in Kosovo. She moved to Embassy Kosovo from the U.S. Mission to NATO in Brussels, where she was the Political Advisor for three years.

In addition, Degnan has served overseas as the Senior Civilian Representative to Brigade Combat Team Salerno in Khost Afghanistan, as Deputy Political Counselor at the United States Embassy in Ankara Turkey, as well as in Botswana, and Pakistan since joining the United States Foreign Service in 1993. She also served as Special Assistant to the Secretary of State and Special Assistant to the Undersecretary of State for Political Affairs during her previous tours in Washington. Ms. Degnan earned the Secretary of State's Expeditionary Service Award, as well as numerous other awards.

Ambassador to Georgia
In her first public speech during the appointment ceremony, Degnan called Russia a hostile neighbor to Georgia, and outlined that her mission would be dedicated to deepening relations between Washington and Tbilisi in the development of democracy, trade and security.

Ambassador Degnan outlined Georgia's impressive progress in the fight against corruption, in matters of doing business and highlighted that 2020 Georgian parliamentary election would play a very important role in the development of Georgia.

In her speech, Kelly Degnan repeatedly called Georgia an important strategic partner of the United States and highlighted the participation of Georgian units in operations in Afghanistan.

Swearing-In Ceremony
Ambassador Degnan's swearing-in ceremony on January 18, 2020, was in the Treaty Room on the Seventh Floor of the U.S. State Department in Washington, DC, and was attended by a number of dignitaries, including the Georgian Ambassador to the United States, Ambassador David Bakradze.

Presentation of Credentials
Degnan presented her credentials to Georgian President Salome Zourabichvili at the Orbeliani Palace in Tbilisi on January 31, 2020.

Personal life 
Degnan speaks Italian, French, Turkish, and Urdu.

References

External links

US Department of State - Ms Degnan

|-

|-

Year of birth missing (living people)
Living people
21st-century American diplomats
USC Gould School of Law alumni
20th-century American diplomats
Medill School of Journalism alumni
Ambassadors of the United States to Italy
Ambassadors of the United States to San Marino
United States Foreign Service personnel
American women ambassadors
Ambassadors of the United States to Georgia (country)
20th-century American women
21st-century American women
American women diplomats